A  (in Irish "cover") or book shrine is an elaborate ornamented metal reliquary box or case used to hold Early Medieval Irish manuscripts or relics. They are typically later than the book they contain, often by several centuries. In most surviving examples the book comes from the peak age of Irish monasticism before 800, and the extant cumdachs date from after 1000, although it is clear the form dates from considerably earlier. The majority are of Irish origin, with most surviving examples now in the National Museum of Ireland (NMI).

The usual form is a design based on a cross on the main face, with use of large gems of rock crystal or other semi-precious stones, leaving the spaces between the arms of the cross for more varied decoration. Several were carried on a metal chain or leather cord, often worn off the belt, or suspended around the neck, placing them next to the heart and thus offering spiritual and perhaps medical benefits (the same was done with the St Cuthbert Gospel in a leather bag in medieval Durham). They were also used to bring healing to the sick or dying, or more formally, as witness contracts. Many had hereditary lay keepers from among the chiefly families who had formed links with monasteries. 

Only five early examples of  survive, including those of the Book of Dimma and Book of Mulling at Trinity College, Dublin, and the Cathach of St. Columba and Stowe Missal. Of the St. Molaise Shrine, only the Gospels are extant; the casing is lost, but more often the reverse is the case. Other books such as the Book of Kells, Book of Armagh and Book of Durrow are known to have once had either  or treasure bindings or both, but as they contained valuable precious metals they were a natural target for looters and thieves.

Characteristics and formats

The format and function of  may derive from book caskets used by early Christian Romans. Both types were intended to protect sacred text or relics, and it is plausible that Irish monasteries would seek to emulate the prestige and, according to the Irish art historian Rachel Moss, "splendor of Roman liturgical ceremonies". The Irish church emphasised relics that were, or were thought to be, objects frequently used by monastic saints, rather than the body parts preferred by most of the church, although these were also kept in local versions of the house-shaped chasse form, such as the Scottish Monymusk Reliquary. Another Irish specialty was the bell-shrine, encasing the hand bells used to summon the community to services or meals, and one of the earliest reliquaries enshrined the belt of an unknown saint, and was probably worn as a test of truthfulness and to cure illness. It probably dates to the 8th century and was found in a peat bog near Moylough, County Sligo.

As the sample size of 8 to 10 surviving examples is so small (presumably many such works are lost, mostly plundered for their precious metal or stones) they cannot be classified typologically. Their shared characteristics include that they are sealed, metal cases built to protect earlier objects of veneration originally placed in a timber core typical built from Yew wood or (less commonly) from oak. All of the later refurbishments were seem to have been commissioned by ambitious clergy members, and the work carried out by single metal-workers and their workshops. In the majority of instances, the master metal-worker left an inscribed signature and date of completion, some of which contain wording that hints at their artistic motivations.

All extant  contain a frontpiece containing a central cross, a reverse with repetitive openwork patterns consisting of two highly contrasted colours (such as red and black), and sides containing interlace patterns and inscriptions. Distinguishing  factors include size (indicating the originally intended function as for example as private fixed shrines pocket books, or objects to be worn over the shoulder or from belts), and their later use. The Shrine of Miosach retains its original chain used to carry it around, while the Soiscél Molaisse and Lough Kinsalen Shrine have fittings that once held leather straps, assumed to have held the objects in place during processional ceremonies.

They are to be distinguished from the metalwork treasure bindings that probably covered most grand liturgical books of the period—the theft and loss of that covering the Book of Kells (if it was not a  alone) is recorded. However the designs may well have been very similar; the best surviving Insular example, the lower cover of the Lindau Gospels in the Morgan Library in New York, is also centered on a large cross, surrounded by interlace panels. Treasure bindings were metalwork assemblies tacked onto the wooden boards of a conventional bookbinding, so essentially the same technically as the faces of many , which are also attached with tacks to a core wooden box.

Commission and production
Historians are generally confident in identifying who commissioned the shrines, and their providence. Exceptions include the Book of Durrow and the Stow Missal. Inscriptions on two examples (Durrow and Stowe) indicate they were for a King of Ireland.

Almost nothing is known of the metal-workers who produced them. A number contain inscriptions that can be read as signatures, but that is the extent of their historical record as even first rank craftsmen of the time were not mentioned in annuals, and were not given obituaries when they died. As craftsmen were not given a high social status, it seems many were illiterate. Some of the signatures are unclear, with instance where the scribe was tasked with writing in Latin, but did not understand how to formulate language.

Function
 basic utilitarian functions were as practical protective covers for their manuscript or relic, and to provide, sometimes portable, private centers of devotion, or were of liturgical use. The majority were intended to hold by then centuries older manuscripts, in instanced assumed to be written by major saints, such as Patrick, or legendary local monastery founders who had died 100s of years before the actual date of the manuscript. For this reason, many of the very early manuscripts owe their survival to their later, active status as relics. Most other early medieval Irish manuscripts were stored away in secure stone buildings, but were over the years sold, stolen or plundered, and thus lost.

The shrines were used during both ecclesiastical and secular ceremonies, such as granting insignia of office, swearing of oaths or signing treaties. The books of Dimma and Mulling were found with inserts containing texts from masses of the dead, indicating they were used for healing purposes. The book of Durrow was periodically removed from its (now lost)  during the late medieval and early modern periods so that it could be used to bless and cure sick animals.

Battle standards 
Reliquaries were often used as battle standards in medieval Ireland, with expectation that they would boost morale, protect the troops, or grant victory. Typically the relics would be held in, or represented by, crosiers, bell-shrines or cumdachs, and carried onto the battlefield by a cleric, who would often be employed by the family as its "hereditary  custodian". The most well-known  used for this purpose is the Cathach of St. Columba (known as The Cathach or Battler of St. Columba), used as a battle talisman by the O'Donnell family. According to art historian Colum Hourihane, "not only did the shrine and its iconography have to instill fear into the enemy, but, more importantly, it had to instill confidence into the army of the O’Donnells following it". The objects were usually worn around the neck, and the tradition was that the holder would circle the area three times in a "sunwise" direction before the battle commenced. Other  known to have been used in this way include the Shrine of Miosach and the Shrine of Caillín. 

Clerics were allowed non-combatant status reducing the likelihood that the reliquary would be captured. Younger clerics were usually selected, according to the historian Anthony Lucas, as a result of "prudent consideration that they stood a better chance than men of mature years of escaping with their precious burden by speed of foot should they find themselves in a tight corner in the melee." However, the holder was sometimes killed in battle; in 1497 The Cathach was captured after its keeper was slain by enemy forces. Similarly, the Book of Armagh is recorded as having been brought to battlefields, and was once recovered from underneath the dead body of its custodian.

Surviving examples
 are particular to Ireland. There are eight known surviving Irish examples (in chronological order: the Lough Kinale Book-Shrine, Soiscél Molaisse, Stowe Missal, The Cathach, Shrine of Miosach, Book of Dimma, Shrine of the Book of Moling, and Shrine of Caillín of Fenagh) with a further two—of the nine extant—"house-shaped shrines", namely the 12th century St Manchan's shrine and the  additions to the Domnach Airgid. All are protective enclosures intended to permanently seal off a manuscript or relic, and date from between the early 9th to the mid-16 centuries.

Several of the earliest documented examples are now lost. The Book of Armagh was given a cover in 937, which was perhaps lost when it was captured in battle and ransomed by the Norman John de Courcy in 1177. The earliest documented example was made to house and protect the Book of Durrow at the behest of the High King of Ireland Flann Sinna (877–916), by which point it was at Durrow, and believed to be a relic of Columba (Colum Cille). The shrine was lost in the 17th century, but its appearance, including an inscription recording the king's patronage, is recorded in a note from 1677, now bound into the book as folio IIv, although other inscriptions are not transcribed. Once in their shrines, such manuscripts were rarely if ever removed for use as a book.

Lough Kinale Book Shrine
The earliest-known  is also the largest surviving example. Moss speculates that it was thrown in the water to evade being taken during a local chieftain feud or before a Viking raid. The inner structure is of oak, lined with tin and bronze plates attached by nails. Its front-side contains a large central cross, five bosses in bronze, and four rounded openwork medallions containing spiral and lentoid patterns. The figures on the sides include beast heads. A 2016 valuation by the NMI priced the object at £2 million (€2.54 million).

Soiscél Molaisse

The Soiscél Molaisse, also known as the Sheskill Molash, is the oldest surviving  example largely in its original form, and was made in the early 11th century to hold the gospels of Molaise. The wooden core with bronze casing is 8th century, to which silver plaques were fastened with nails and rivets in the 11th century, and it was re-worked again in the 14th or 15th century.

Some of the figures and other elements date to the 14th century, and can be identified as they were soldered to the plates. The top face is mainly silvered bronze and silver-gilt and contains panels the four symbols of the Evangelists in the spaces between a cross. Some of the panels are lost; those that remain have gold filigree interlaced knotwork. The filigree on the arms of the cross are gilted and decorated with ribbon interlace. The ends of the arms were set with gems, now also lost except for one blue stone. Two of panels around the sides are lost. The two remaining contain interlace and Latin inscription around their borders. Its small size indicates that the original object, like the Book of Dimma, was designed to be held in a pocket.

Stowe Missal

The Stowe Missal is a sacramentary dating to about 750. Its  consists of metalwork plaques attached with nails to an older oak container. The metalwork is elaborately decorated, with some animal and human figures, and one face and the sides probably date to between 1027 and 1033, on the basis of inscriptions recording its donation and making, while the other face is later, and can be dated to about 1375, again from its inscriptions.

The older "lower" face, which has become detached from the case, is in silver-gilt copper alloy, with a large cross inside a border that carries the inscription in Irish, which also runs along the arms of the cross. The centre of the cross was later replaced ("severely embellished" as the National Museum put it), probably at the same time as the later face, by a setting for a now missing large stone with four lobed sections, similar to the centre of the lower face. The inscription has missing sections because of this, but can mostly be reconstructed as asking for a prayer for the abbot of Lorrha, Mathgamain Ua Cathail and for Find Ua Dúngalaigh, king of Múscraige Tíre.

Cathach of St. Columba

The Cathach of St. Columba, also known as The Cathach, is probably the best-known . Built for the Cathach of St. Columba, an important psalter usually dated to just after the death of Colum Cille in 597, it is probably the earliest Irish book to survive and a very prestigious relic. The manuscript belonged to the O'Donnells while its shrine was famously used as a battle standard. 

The initial metalwork dates from 1072–1098 at Kells, when a new protective casing of wood and silver was added. The frontpiece  was added in the 14th century, and included a large seated Christ in Majesty flanked by scenes of the Crucifixion and saints in gilt repoussé. It was taken to the continent in 1691 following the Treaty of Limerick, and did not return to Ireland until 1813. It was by then in very poor condition, but underwent a major restoration in 1982 when the extant pages were rebound and remounted on vellum leaves.

Shrine of Miosach

The Shrine of Miosach (or The Misach) originates from Clonmany, County Donegal, and was also used in battle. Originally a late 11th century relic, it was re-worked in 1534 by the goldsmith Brian O'Morrison with repoussé silver decoration with many figures round a cross. O'Morrison added twelve front plates in three arrangements, including depictions the crowned Virgin and Child in the smaller inner panels, and, in four larger panels, Saint Bridget, St. Patrick and Colm Cille.

There is no record of what the original container might have held. The object was at first associated with St Cairneach of Dulane, County Meath, but by the Gothic period had been "absorbed into the cult of St Columba". The 11th century cast copper alloy plates on the sides are decorated with openwork zoomorphic illustrations. Its metal cord survives for carrying it, and it was probably round the neck.

Domnach Airgid

The reworking of the Domnach Airgid, whose title translated in English as the Silver church, dates to the 8th century, but little is visible from before major additions dated to  under commission by the abbot of Clones. A three-dimensional figure of Christ crucified is at the centre of the main face, accompanied by relief plaques of saints, the Virgin and Child and other scenes on the sides. 

The reliefs are more sophisticated compared to the other known 14th-century , with elegant running animals on small mounts at the corners. It is signed by its goldsmith John O Bardan, who is recorded living at Drogheda; by then goldsmiths in Ireland, as elsewhere in Europe, were usually laymen.

Book of Dimma
The Book of Dimma cumdach dates to the 12th century and was built for the small 8th-century manuscript known as the Book of Dimma. The manuscript is traditionally associated with the abbey's founder St Crónán ( 619). Its small size indicated it was intended as a portable pocket book used for study or contemplation. It is made up of copies of four Gospels and contains stylised portraits of the Apostles St. Matthew, St. Mark and St. Luke.

The shrine consists of a shell of decorated bronze plates, and like its illuminated manuscript originates from the abbey of Roscrea. It was refurbished  by one of the chieftains of the local Ua Cerbaill family. One face of the 's panels of openwork decoration in Viking Ringerike style. Like the manuscript, it is in Trinity College Library, Dublin, while an early 20th century reproduction is in New York.

Shrine of Caillín of Fenagh

The Shrine of Caillín of Fenagh is a late example, and was built to hold a  manuscript which updates a much earlier book detailing the life of St. Caillín of Fenagh, County Leitrim (fl. ), which may have been written by the saint himself. Caillín is described by Lucas as "something of a specialist in the production of battle talismans" and according to legend, in his lifetime commissioned a number of battle standards, including  in the form a bell and a containers for a Gospel. The  was badly damaged in a 2009 fire at St Mel's Cathedral, Longford, where it had been kept since 1980. It was acquired by the NMI the following year, while the manuscript is in the collection of the Royal Irish Academy.

Study and conservation
Although most of the extant book shaped protective shrines are mentioned in Irish annals, they were not properly described until the early 19th century, when antiquarians and collectors such as George Petrie began to seek them out from hereditary collections. Most are badly damaged, including due to general wear and tear over the centuries, events such as fires at their holding location, or most usually, having elements such as their gemstones removed for sale by their owners. A majority are now in the NMI. 

The most significant lost  mentioned in Irish annals, which are also the three earliest, are the shrines for the Book of Armagh (added 938 AD), Book of Durrow and the shrine for the Book of Kells (which may have only been an ornamental metal container, rather than an permanently sealed and illustrated cover), which is recorded as plundered in the 1007 annals of Ulster.

References

Notes

Sources

"Antiquities": Wallace, Patrick F., O Floinn, Raghnall eds. Treasures of the National Museum of Ireland: Irish Antiquities, 2002, Gill & Macmillan, Dublin, 
 Crawford, Henry. "A Descriptive List of Irish Shrines and Reliquaries. Part I". The Journal of the Royal Society of Antiquaries of Ireland, 6th series, volume 13, no. 1, June 1923. 
 Fitzpatrick, Elizabeth. Royal Inauguration in Gaelic Ireland C.1100-1600: A Cultural Landscape Study. Suffolk: Boydell Press, 2004. 
 Hourihane, Colum. Gothic Art in Ireland 1169-1550: Enduring Vitality. New Haven, CT: Yale University Press, 2003. 
 Joynt, M. "The Cathach of St. Columba". The Irish Church Quarterly, Volume 10, no. 39, 1917. 
 Kelly, Eamonn. "The Lough Kinale book-shrine". In: "Age of migrating ideas: early medieval art in northern Britain and Ireland proceedings of the Second International Conference on Insular Art held in the National Museums of Scotland in Edinburgh, 3–6 January 1991". Edinburgh: National Museums of Scotland, 1993. "
 Kelly, Eamonn. The Lough Kinale Shrine: The Implication for the Manuscripts. In: O'Mahony, Felicity. "The Book of Kells: Proceedings of a conference at Trinity College, Dublin, 6–9 September 1992". Dublin: Trinity College & Scolar Press, 1994. 
 Lacey, Brian. Manus O'Donnell's 'Life of Colum Cille'''. Dublin: Four Courts Press, 1998. 
 Lucas, Anthony. "The Social Role of Relics and Reliquaries in Ancient Ireland". The Journal of the Royal Society of Antiquaries of Ireland, volume 116, 1986. 
 Meehan, Bernard. The Book of Durrow: A Medieval Masterpiece at Trinity College Dublin, 1996, Town House, Dublin, 
 Mitchell, Perette. "The Inscriptions on Pre-Norman Irish Reliquaries". Proceedings of the Royal Irish Academy: Archaeology, Culture, History, Literature, volume 96C, no. 1, 1996. 
 Moss, Rachel. Medieval c. 400—c. 1600: Art and Architecture of Ireland. New Haven, CT: Yale University Press, 2014. 
 Mullarkey, Paul. "Shrine of The Misach". In: Moss, Rachel. Medieval c. 400—c. 1600. (Art and Architecture of Ireland series). New Haven, CT: Yale University Press, 2014. 
 O'Buachalla, Brendan. "The F-Future in Modern Irish: A Reassessment". Royal Irish Academy, 1985. 
 Ó Floinn, Raghnall. "The Soiscél Molaisse". Clogher Record, volume 13, no. 2, 1989. 
 Ó Floinn, Raghnall. "Description" of the "Book-shrine" on The Stowe Missal, from the Royal Irish Academy, with good images and catalogue information – select "Royal Irish Academy" from drop-down "collections" menu at bottom left, then select "Stowe Missal" from the next menu.
 O'Neill, Timothy. The Irish Hand: Scribes and Their Manuscripts From the Earliest Times. Cork: Cork University Press, 2014. 
 Overbey, Karen. Sacral Geographies: Saints, Shrines and Territory in Medieval Ireland. Turnhout: Brepols, 2012. 
 Scott, Brendan. "The Making of the Book of Fenagh". History Ireland, volume 25, no. 3, 2017. 
 Stokes, Margaret, Early Christian Art in Ireland, 1887, 2004 photo-reprint, Kessinger Publishing, Google Books
 The Stowe Missal: MS. D. II. 3 in the Library of the Royal Irish Academy, Dublin, edited by George F. Warner (1906), from the Internet Archive
 Stalley, Roger. "Irish Art in the Romanesque and Gothic Periods". In: Treasures of early Irish art, 1500 B.C. to 1500 A.D: From the collections of the National Museum of Ireland, Royal Irish Academy, Trinity College Dublin. NY: Metropolitan Museum of Art, 1977. 
 Stevick, Robert. "St Patrick's Bell Shrine: Form and Layout of the Plates". The Journal of the Royal Society of Antiquaries of Ireland, volume 138, 2008. 
 Stokes, Roy. A Bibliographical Companion. Scarecrow Press, 2011. 
 Youngs, Susan (ed). "The Work of Angels", Masterpieces of Celtic Metalwork, 6th–9th centuries AD''. British Museum Press, London, 1989.

External links

Report of lecture by Paul Mullarkey to the Royal Society of Antiquaries of Ireland, 10 October 2005

Bookbinding
Christian reliquaries
Hiberno-Saxon manuscripts
Irish art
Medieval art
Medieval European metalwork objects
Medieval Ireland